

Results summary

Results

Alresford & Itchen Valley

Badger Farm & Oliver's Battery

Bishops Waltham

Central Meon Valley

Colden Common & Twyford

Denmead

Southwick & Wickham

St Barnabas

St Bartholomew

St Michael

St Paul

The Worthys

Upper Meon Valley

Whiteley & Shedfield

Wonston & Micheldever

Winchester City Council elections
2022 English local elections